May 7 - Eastern Orthodox Church calendar - May 9

All fixed commemorations below celebrated on May 21 by Orthodox Churches on the Old Calendar.

For May 8th, Orthodox Churches on the Old Calendar commemorate the Saints listed on April 25.

Saints
 Holy Apostle and Evangelist John the Theologian, the "beloved disciple" of the Lord (c. 101) 
 The holy group of Soldier Martyrs
 Saint Augustina the Martyr, in Byzantium
 Saint Agathius (Acacius of Byzantium) (303)
 Saint Emilia, mother of saints Macrina, Basil the Great, Naucratius, Peter of Sebaste, and Gregory of Nyssa (375)
 Saint Arsenius the Great, of Scetis (448)
 Saint Hierax (Ierakos) of Egypt (5th century)
 Saint Milles the Melodist (hymnographer), monk

Pre-Schism Western saints
 Hieromartyr Dionysius of Vienne (193)
 Martyr Victor of Milan (Victor the Moor, Victor Maurus) (c. 303)
 Saint Helladius of Auxerre (387)
 Saint Gybrian (Gobrian) of Ireland, Priest (509)
 Saint Desideratus, successor of St Arcadius as Bishop of Bourges, in France (550)
 Saint Iduberga, foundress of Nivelles (Nijvel), (Neth.) (652)
 Saint Benedict II, Pope of Rome (685) 
 Hieromartyr Indract of Glastonbury, and his companions at Shapwick (c. 7th or 8th century)  (see also: February 5)
 Saints Wiro (Bishop of Utrecht) (710), Plechelm (730), and Hierodeacon Otger (Odger) (8th century), Missionary bishops in the Maas Valley at Limburg
 Saint Macarius of Ghent, archbishop (1012)

Post-Schism Orthodox saints
 Saint Pimen the Faster, of the Far Caves in Kiev (c. 1141)
 Venarable Cassian, recluse and faster of the Kiev Caves (13th-14th centuries)
 Saint Arsenius the Lover of Labor, of the Kiev Caves (14th century)
 The Monks Zosima and Adrian of Volokolamsk, founders of the Sestrinsk monastery on the banks of the River Sestra (15th-16th centuries)

New martyrs and confessors
 Martyr Nicephorus Zaitsev (1942)

Other commemorations
 Apparition of the Archangel Michael on Mount Gargano near Manfredonia in southern Italy, to Bishop Laurence of Siponto, in memory of which the famous Monastery of the Archangel was founded (c. 490)
 Commemoration of the miraculous healing of blinded Stephen by the Most Holy Theotokos of Kassiopi, Corfu (1530)
 Translation of the relics (1785) of St. Arsenius of Novgorod, Fool-for-Christ (1570)
 Schema-hieromonk Michael of Valaam, Confessor for the Orthodox Calendar (1934)

Icon gallery

Notes

References

Sources
 Complete List of Saints, Protection of the Mother of God Church (POMOG)
 May 8, OCA - The Lives of the Saints.
 May 8/21, Orthodox Calendar (PRAVOSLAVIE.RU)
 May 21 / May 8, HOLY TRINITY RUSSIAN ORTHODOX CHURCH (A parish of the Patriarchate of Moscow)
 VALAAM  PATERICON.
 Dr. Alexander Roman. May. Calendar of Ukrainian Orthodox Saints (Ukrainian Orthodoxy - Українське Православ'я).
 May 8. Latin Saints of the Orthodox Patriarchate of Rome.
 May 8, The Roman Martyrology.
Greek Sources
 Great Synaxaristes:  8 ΜΑΪΟΥ, ΜΕΓΑΣ ΣΥΝΑΞΑΡΙΣΤΗΣ.
  Συναξαριστής. 8 Μαΐου. ECCLESIA.GR. (H ΕΚΚΛΗΣΙΑ ΤΗΣ ΕΛΛΑΔΟΣ). 
Russian Sources
  21 мая (8 мая). Православная Энциклопедия под редакцией Патриарха Московского и всея Руси Кирилла (электронная версия). (Orthodox Encyclopedia - Pravenc.ru).
  8 мая (ст.ст.) 21 мая 2013 (нов. ст.). Русская Православная Церковь Отдел внешних церковных связей. (DECR).

May in the Eastern Orthodox calendar